Kill Me Kiss Me may refer to:

 Kill Me, Kiss Me, a Korean manhwa
 Kill Me Kiss Me (album), a 2008 album by Hangry & Angry

See also 
 Kiss Me, Kill Me (disambiguation)